Gorelov, female form Gorelova, is a Russian surname.

Notable people
Notable people having this surname include:
 Galina Gorelova, also known as Halina Harelava, Belarusian composer
 Gavriil Gorelov, Russian painter
 Igor Gorelov, Russian footballer
 Natalya Gorelova, Russian runner
 Nikolay Gorelov, Russian cyclist
 Sergei Gorelov, Russian footballer

References

Russian-language surnames